Windsor Unified School District or WUSD is the public school district in Windsor, California. The district serves 5,400 students from kindergarten through high school. Its 2013 API score was 776.

Schools
There are 7 schools in the district: 
 Windsor High School (Grades 9-12)
 Windsor Oaks Academy (Grades 10-12)
 Windsor Middle School (Grades 6-8)
 Cali Calmécac Language Academy (Grades K-8)
 Brooks Elementary School (Grades 3-5)
 Mattie Washburn Elementary School (Grades K-2)

In 2018/2019 School year it was decided that Windsor Creek Elementary School (Grades 2-3) will be closing because of lack of students. Grade 2 was transferred to Mattie Washburn Elementary School and Grade 3 was transferred to Brooks Elementary School.

Windsor Unified is also the lead agency in the North County Consortium, which serves students with special needs in 7 area school districts.

Awards
Windsor Unified School District earned two California Golden Bell Awards from the California School Boards Association: the first in 1999 and the second in 2008.

Four of Windsor's schools have been recognized as California Distinguished Schools by the California State Board of Education.
2009: Windsor Middle School
2006: Brooks Elementary School
2005: Windsor High School
2004: Windsor Creek Elementary School
2001: Windsor Middle School

Windsor's alternative high school, Windsor Oaks Academy, was named a Model Continuation High School in 2012 by the California State Superintendent of Public Instruction.

References

External links

See also
 List of school districts in Sonoma County, California

School districts in Sonoma County, California
Windsor, California